The Art Ensemble of Rake/The Tell-Tale Moog is the second studio album by Rake., released in 1995 by VHF Records.

Track listing

Personnel 
Adapted from The Art Ensemble of Rake/The Tell-Tale Moog liner notes.
Rake.
Jim Ayre – electric guitar, vocals
Bill Kellum – bass guitar
Carl Moller – drums, saxophone

Release history

References

External links 
 The Art Ensemble of Rake/The Tell-Tale Moog at Discogs (list of releases)

1995 albums
Rake (band) albums
VHF Records albums